The Mill of Muchalls is an historic water-powered mill located along the Burn of Muchalls in Aberdeenshire, Scotland.  This mill is situated near to the coast of the North Sea proximate to Doonie Point.  The earliest position of the village of Muchalls lay slightly to the south of the Mill of Muchalls. The Mill of Muchalls is situated slightly to the east of the ancient Causey Mounth trackway, a drovers' road established at least as early as the High Middle Ages.

See also
 Bridge of Muchalls
 Muchalls Castle

References

Watermills in Scotland